Martin Lipp ( in Vooru, Viljandi Parish – 8 March 1923 in Tallinn) was an Estonian poet. He is best known as the author of the poem , which was set to the music of the then young composer Enn Võrk. That song became as popular to the Estonian people as the Marseillaise was to the French in the times of the French Revolution and also played an important role during the time of the Estonian "Singing Revolution" in the late 1980s.

Lipp also served as the pastor of the St. Lawrence Church in Nõo, Estonia.

External links
IAUNRC: Estonia at www.indiana.edu Estonian flag based on poem by Martin Lipp

1854 births
1923 deaths
People from Viljandi Parish
People from the Governorate of Livonia
Estonian Lutheran clergy
Estonian male poets
19th-century Estonian poets
20th-century Estonian poets
University of Tartu alumni